Sulattofestival is organized in Karkkila. It is organized by Karkkila's Music and Art association (Kamut ry). The festival was held for the first time in 2008. In the Summer the festival is four days long, but Sulattofestival also creates events throughout the year.

Kamut ry was founded in 2007. The association organizes art and music events, takes a stand on different matters and discusses. The goal is to improve the cultural opportunities in Karkkila and the areas near. Raimo "Ramppe" Pitkänen is the chairman of Kamut ry and the organizer of Sulattofestival.

Sulatto 2008 
Produced by Karkkila's Music and Art association (Raimo Pitkänen, producer): Finland's premiere of Astor Piazzola's and Horacio Ferrer's opera Maria de Buenos Aires in Finnish.

Maria was performed by opera singer Eeva-Kaarina Vilke.

Finnish composer Heikki Valpola's world premiere of Rautakantaatti for four singers, percussions and piano quintet.

Tuomari Nurmio

Classic movies chosen by academic Aki Kaurismäki for example Jean Vigo: L'Atalante

Sulatto 2009 
Blues evening: Tomi Leino blues band

featuring harpist West Weston (UK) and singer Jimmy Lawson (USA).

M.A. Numminen's tango -and swing orchestra

Sulattoclub: Kari Peitsamo

Children's Sulatto: Gommi and Pommi and a family movie: Liisa Helminen's Pelikaanimies

Sulatto's ending club: Pepe Ahlqvist

Autumn Sulatto 2009 
Mikkeli's cityorchestra strings and Kauko Röyhkä, conductor Vellu Halkosalmi

Sulatto 2010 
Main performance: Louisiana Red and Little Victor’s Juke Point (USA). 
 
Helsinki – Berlin – Paris -concert

(Eeva-Kaarina Vilke, vocals, Mikko Perkola viola da gamba, vocals and keys and Mikko Kujanpää, contrabass)

Hoodoo Revue: Jo' Buddy & Down Home King III, Tomi Leino Blues Band, Juho Hurskainen & Jays Frantics

Academic Aki Kaurismäki's movie: I hired a contract killer

Winter Sulatto 2011 
Saturday's main performance: Boo Boo Davis (John Gerritse, drums and Jan Mittendorp, guitar) (USA)

Friday: Tim Lothar (guitar and vocals) and Peter Nande (harmonica and vocals) (DEN)

References

External links
http://www.sulattofestivaali.info/
http://www.kamutry.com/

Music festivals in Finland
Recurring events established in 2008